The 1939 Lehigh Engineers football team was an American football team that represented Lehigh University during the 1939 college football season. In its sixth season under head coach Glen Harmeson, the team compiled a 3–6 record, and lost both games against its Middle Three Conference rivals.  

The team played its home games at Taylor Stadium in Bethlehem, Pennsylvania.

Schedule

References

Lehigh
Lehigh Mountain Hawks football seasons
Lehigh Engineers football